Louis Scott (born 4 March 1982), nicknamed Louis, is a Scottish-Thai singer and actor. He is best known for his roles in Dok Som See Thong, Sawan Biang, Bupphe Sanniwat, and Roy Leh Marnya on Thailand's Channel 3.

Early life 
Louis is the son of Ian James Scott and Siwaporn Likittamrak. He has an older brother named Stuart Scott. He graduated from Bangkok Patana School and then from Southern New Hampshire University with a degree in business administration.

Career 
Louis entered the entertainment industry at the age of 7, starting with an advertisement. In 1994, he made his debut in the movie "ตแล้วต้องโต๋", but he became famous for being in a duo band called "Raptor" with Joni Anwar, who at the time was the youngest singer in Thailand. The duo released their first album, Raptor in the 1990s and became a very popular duo.

After five years, the duo band Raptor decided to disband. The reason for the break up of Raptor is because they want to go back to school; they missed out on a lot. They take so many jobs that they don't have time to study, so they eventually parted ways in different directions.  After that, Louis came back again with a remarkable drama that made him famous again, namely the drama Dok Som See Thong with the role of "CK".

He continues to make a name for himself with the role of "Tom / Pawan" in the TV drama Sawan Biang starred top actress Ann Thongprasom  and top actor Theeradej Wongpuapan.

In 2018, Louis starred in Bupphe Sanniwat, which was a major hit in Thailand and gained popularity across Asia.

Personal life 
Louis was married to Ramida Praphasanobol after 14 years of relationship and had a simple marriage ceremony on 20 March 2020.

Filmography

Films

Television

Master of Ceremony: MC

Discography

Albums

Awards and nominations

References

External links 
 
 

Living people
1982 births
Louis Scott
Louis Scott
Louis Scott
Louis Scott
Louis Scott
Louis Scott
Louis Scott